Luca Madonia (born 4 June 1957) is an Italian singer-songwriter and musician.

Life and career 
Born in Catania, he started his career as a member of the new wave band Denovo. After the group disbanded, he debuted as a solo singer-songwriter, releasing several critically acclaimed albums. As a songwriter he collaborated with several artists, including Andrea Mirò, Patty Pravo, and Gianni Morandi. As a singer, he made duets with Franco Battiato, Carmen Consoli, Grazia Di Michele and Mario Venuti, among others. His single "La consuetudine" was the theme song of the Radio Rai program Hobo.

Discography  
     1991 – Passioni e manie
     1993 – Bambolina
     1994 – Moto perpetuo
     2000 – Solo (EP)
     2002 – La consuetudine 
     2003 – Cinque minuti e poi (EP)
     2004 – L'essenziale  (Anthology)
     2006 – Vulnerabile
     2008 – Parole contro parole
     2011 – L'alieno
     2015 – La Monotonia dei giorni

References

External links 
 
 
 Luca Madonia at Discogs

Musicians from Catania
1957 births
Italian pop singers
Italian male singers
Living people
Italian singer-songwriters